Store Færder Lighthouse is a former coastal lighthouse in the municipality of Tjøme in Vestfold og Telemark, Norway. The lighthouse was located on the island of Store Færder, first lit in 1696. From the start the light was simply an iron pot placed on the ground. Later a stone tower was built, finished in 1802. A lens was installed in 1852. In 1857 the lighthouse was replaced by the new Færder Lighthouse on Tristein. The stone tower at Store Færder is now in ruins. The ruins along with the other station buildings are listed as a protected site.

See also

 List of lighthouses in Norway
 Lighthouses in Norway

References

External links
 Norsk Fyrhistorisk Forening 

Lighthouses completed in 1696
Lighthouses completed in 1802
Lighthouses in Vestfold og Telemark
Listed lighthouses in Norway
1696 establishments in Norway